The 2020 St. Petersburg Ladies' Trophy was a professional tennis tournament played on indoor hard courts. It was the 11th edition of the tournament and a WTA Premier tournament on the 2020 WTA Tour. The tournament was held between 10 February and 16 February 2020.

Point distribution

Prize money

1Qualifiers prize money is also the Round of 32 prize money.
*per team

Singles main draw entrants

Seeds

1 Rankings as of February 3, 2020.

Other entrants
The following players received wildcards into the singles main draw:
  Belinda Bencic
  Daria Kasatkina 
  Johanna Konta
  Svetlana Kuznetsova

The following players received entry from the qualifying draw:
  Kristie Ahn
  Alizé Cornet 
  Vitalia Diatchenko 
  Océane Dodin
  Anastasia Potapova 
  Liudmila Samsonova

The following player received entry as a lucky loser:
  Fiona Ferro

Withdrawals
Before the tournament
  Danielle Collins → replaced by  Kateřina Siniaková
  Anett Kontaveit → replaced by  Viktória Kužmová
  Rebecca Peterson → replaced by  Jennifer Brady
  Anastasija Sevastova → replaced by  Fiona Ferro

During the tournament
  Petra Kvitová (illness)

Doubles main draw entrants

Seeds

1 Rankings as of February 3, 2020.

Other entrants 
The following pair received a wildcard into the doubles main draw:
  Daria Mishina /  Ekaterina Shalimova

Champions

Singles

  Kiki Bertens def.  Elena Rybakina, 6–1, 6–3

Doubles

  Shuko Aoyama /  Ena Shibahara def.  Kaitlyn Christian /  Alexa Guarachi, 4–6, 6–0, [10–3]

References

External links
 Official website

2020 in Russian tennis
2020 in Russian women's sport
Ladies' Trophy
St. Petersburg Ladies Trophy
St. Petersburg
St. Petersburg Ladies' Trophy